The Emmett Till Unsolved Civil Rights Crime Act is an Act of the United States Congress introduced by John Lewis (GA-5) that allows cold cases of suspected violent crimes committed against African Americans before 1970 to be reopened. The U.S. House of Representatives passed the legislation on June 20, 2007, by a vote of 422 to 2. The U.S. Senate passed the legislation on September 24, 2008, by unanimous consent, and President George W. Bush signed the bill into law on October 7.

Background

Background to legislation 
Racially motivated violent crimes were committed in the United States as part of suppression of minorities, especially in the South. These crimes, often lynchings of Black men, were rarely investigated or prosecuted by states. The killings were part of an oppressive order of Jim Crow custom and law, and lynchings were a form of terrorism against Black people. A 2015 study found that almost four thousand lynchings, mostly of Black men, took place in Southern America between 1877 and 1950. This report compiled an increased number of such documented killings, most of which occurred in the decades around the turn of the 20th century. The vast majority of people responsible for these lynchings, generally mobs or small groups of white local residents, were never held responsible for their actions.

During the civil rights era, additional waves of more isolated killings or lynchings took place, committed by smaller groups organized in opposition to integration and civil rights, such as KKK chapters, or individuals. The Emmett Till Unsolved Civil Rights Crime Act, passed in 2008, authorized the federal government to reopen these cold cases for investigation and prosecution, in an attempt to bring perpetrators to justice and discover the truths behind the events. It was hoped that new technologies and investigation by the FBI might reveal new information.

Origin of the name of the act 
Emmett Till was a fourteen-year-old Black boy from Chicago who, in the summer of 1955 on a visit to family in Mississippi, was accused of whistling at, or flirting with, a young married white woman in a grocery store. He was abducted, beaten, mutilated, and shot in the head before his body was weighted down in a nearby river. Till's murderers were tried but were acquitted by an all-white jury. (At the time, Black people were prohibited from voting and thus generally excluded from juries.) The two men later confessed to killing Till in an interview with Life magazine. They were never retried or convicted for his murder. Many years later, the woman who had accused Till of behaving inappropriately admitted that she had lied about the events.

The new legislation was named for Till because his case is a prime example of the criminal justice system failing to gain justice for minority victims of racial violence. The bill authorized investigation of cold cases especially from the civil rights era, in an effort to bring perpetrators to justice and solve open cases.

Legislation 
The Emmett Till Unsolved Civil Rights Crime Act was first proposed in 2007 and was passed by Congress and signed by the president in 2008. In the House of Representatives, the original sponsors of the bill were Rep. John Lewis (D-Georgia), Rep. Jim Sensenbrenner, and Rep. John Conyers (D-Michigan). In the Senate, the effort was led by Sen. Claire McCaskill (D-Missouri), Sen. Richard Burr (R-North Carolina), and Sen. Patrick Leahy (D-Vermont).

The bill creates increased collaboration between local or state law enforcement, the FBI, and other elements of the Department of Justice. Overall, its primary purpose is to authorize investigation and prosecution of cold cases that appear related to civil rights violations. As of its authorization in 2008, the bill could apply to any case of a crime committed before December 31, 1969.

In addition, the bill provides for assisting the families of victims of civil rights crimes.

Success 
As a result of new investigations undertaken of some cold cases from the Civil Rights era, several cases have been closed, in terms of determining the facts. But governments have been less successful in prosecuting the perpetrators of these crimes, as some suspects and witnesses have died in the intervening decades.

As of 2015, only one of these several cases had made it to court and resulted in a successful prosecution. This was the case of Jimmie Lee Jackson, who was fatally shot in Alabama in 1964 by James Fowler, a state police officer. He pleaded guilty to manslaughter and served six months in prison.

There have been legal obstacles in prosecuting some of the cases. For example, the Fifth Amendment protects Americans from being tried twice on charges for which they have already been found not guilty. With the benefit of all-white juries, defendants were acquitted who observers think were guilty. As the Department of Justice has noted, prosecution of cold cases has been difficult, given the length of time since the events. Involved parties can be challenging to locate, or dead, and evidence can be missing or destroyed.

2016 Reauthorization 
When the bill was reauthorized on December 10, 2016, changes were made to address concerns about how it was operating. The Emmett Till Unsolved Civil Rights Crimes Reauthorization Act contained a number of new provisions intended to increase success of the government's actions. It aimed to connect the FBI, the Department of Justice, and law enforcement officers to organizations, such as universities or advocacy groups, that had also been investigating cold cases from the Civil Rights era. Other modifications to the bill included changing the time period to which the bill applied (including all cases before December 31, 1979), clarifying the purpose of the bill, urging the Department of Justice to review specific cases, and eliminating the sunset provision of the original bill, which stated that the bill expired at the end of the 2017 fiscal year.

Related 

 Emmett Till
 John Lewis
 Civil Rights Movement

References 

Acts of the 110th United States Congress
United States federal civil rights legislation
Emmett Till